Konstantinos Gikas (1913 – 1980) was a Greek footballer. He played in five matches for the Greece national football team from 1930 to 1938. He was also part of Greece's team for their qualification matches for the 1938 FIFA World Cup.

References

External links
 

1913 births
1980 deaths
Greece international footballers
Place of birth missing
Association footballers not categorized by position
Footballers from Athens
Greek footballers